Apanisagrion lais, the black-and-white damsel, is a species of damselfly in the family Coenagrionidae, and is the only species in the genus Apanisagrion.

References

Further reading

 
 
 

Coenagrionidae
Articles created by Qbugbot